Donald Cairns (born October 8, 1955) is a Canadian former professional ice hockey player. He played 9 games in the National Hockey League (NHL) for the Kansas City Scouts and Colorado Rockies between 1975 and 1977, as well as several years in various minor leagues during his career, which lasted from 1975 to 1978. Selected by the Scouts in the 1975 NHL Amateur Draft and the Michigan Stags of the World Hockey Association in the 1975 WHA Amateur Draft, Cairns signed with the Scouts and made his NHL debut that year, playing 7 games in the NHL and 33 in and the minor leagues. He played a further 2 NHL games the following year with Colorado, where the Scouts had relocated to, again spending time in the minors, and briefly played one further season before retiring in 1978.

Early life
Cairns was born in Red Deer, Alberta and was raised in the neighbourhood of Fairview and went to Lord Beaverbrook High School in south Calgary.

Pro hockey career
Cairns was drafted by the Kansas City Scouts in the second round of the 1975 NHL Amateur Draft. He was also selected by the  Michigan Stags in the second round of the World Hockey Association (WHA) Amateur Draft in that same year.

Despite having a respectable minor career his professional one was short lived he bounced around the minors and got called up playing just seven games in the National Hockey League wearing jersey #20 for the Kansas City Scouts. He would end up playing two more games for the Rockies after the Scouts moved after poor season ticket sales in Kansas City.

In Colorado, Cairns would attain his only NHL point, an assist. He retired from hockey after the 1977–1978 season.

Career statistics

Regular season and playoffs

References

External links

Game Roster Kansas City Scouts, vs Philadelphia Flyers 17 January 1976 flyershistory.net

1955 births
Living people
Calgary Canucks players
Canadian ice hockey forwards
Canadian people of Scottish descent
Colorado Rockies (NHL) players
Flint Generals (IHL) players
Ice hockey people from Alberta
Kansas City Scouts draft picks
Kansas City Scouts players
Michigan Stags draft picks
Oklahoma City Blazers (1965–1977) players
Phoenix Roadrunners (CHL) players
Port Huron Flags (IHL) players
Sportspeople from Red Deer, Alberta
Victoria Cougars (WHL) players